César Cuauhtémoc García Hernández is an American scholar of migration studies and Gregory Williams Chair in Civil Rights and Civil Liberties at Ohio State University. He supports abolishing immigration detention in the United States.

Works

References

Migration studies scholars
Ohio State University faculty
Hispanic and Latino American academics
Year of birth missing (living people)
Living people